This is the complete list of number-one albums in Finland in 2022 according to the Official Finnish Charts compiled by Musiikkituottajat. The chart is based on sales of physical and digital albums as well as music streaming.

Chart history

See also
List of number-one singles of 2022 (Finland)

References

Number-one albums
Finland Albums
2022